Smerinthulus witti is a species of moth of the family Sphingidae. It is known from Yunnan and Guangxi in China.

References

Smerinthulus
Moths described in 2000